Hebes Chasma is an isolated chasma just north of the Valles Marineris canyon system of Mars. It is centered at 1 degree southern latitude and 76 degrees western longitude, just between the Martian equator and the Valles Marineris system, just east of the Tharsis region.

Geography
Hebes Chasma is a completely closed depression in the surface of Mars, with no outflows to the nearby Echus Chasma to the west, Perrotin Crater to the southwest, or Valles Marineris to the south. Its maximum extents are approximately 320 km east to west, 130 km north to south,  and 5 to 6 km in depth. At the center of the depression is Hebes Mensa, a large mesa rising some 5 km off the valley floor, nearly as high as the surrounding terrain. This central plateau makes Hebes Chasma a unique valley in Martian geography.

In high resolution pictures of Mars Express ( http://spaceinimages.esa.int/Images/2013/10/Hebes_Chasma )
blue areas at the deepest section of the depression show characteristics of a lake: Sharp borders between the yellow and blue area and light blue near the yellow area, becoming darker away from the border.

History of name
The word Hebes comes from Hebe, the goddess of youth, who was the daughter of Zeus and Hera.  Hebe was the wife of Hercules.

Origin of mesa 
The walls of Hebes Chasma weather differently than the slopes on the mesa on its floor.  Also, studies of the thermal inertia suggest that the mesa and the walls of the canyon are made of different substances.  Thermal inertia is how long the surface holds heat.  For example, rocky areas will stay warmer than dust at night.  One popular idea that explains the difference between the depression's walls and the mesa slopes is that the mesa was formed from material that accumulated in a lake.

See also
Geography of Mars

References

External links
A trough in the grand canyon of Mars - European Space Agencies 3-dimensional images of Hebes Chasma
 Fly-through movie of Hebes Chasma - video from Mars Express data, also available in Windows Media Player version
Hebes Chasma on Google Mars - scrollable map centered on Hebes Chasma
History's Layers in Hebes Chasma - THEMIS feature page on Hebes Chasma
Terragen render of Hebes Chasma

Valleys and canyons on Mars
Coprates quadrangle